The British Rail Class 374, also referred to as the Eurostar e320, is a type of electric multiple unit passenger train used on Eurostar services through the Channel Tunnel to serve destinations beyond the core routes to Paris and Brussels. They began to run passenger services in November 2015. The trains, owned by Eurostar International Limited, are sixteen-coach versions of the Siemens Velaro. The trains are compliant with the Technical Specifications for Interoperability (TSI).

Eurostar International's older fleet of Class 373 "Eurostar e300" trains, introduced in 1994 when the Channel Tunnel opened, could not be used on the 15 kV AC overhead line (OHLE) electrification system used in Germany, and most of the older trains could not be used on the 1.5 kV DC overhead line (OHLE) electrification system used in the Netherlands, and the trains did not have sufficient space onboard to install ERTMS signalling. This meant that Eurostar could not run its Class 373 units on services to these countries, and the Class 374 was designed and built to overcome these problems, and enable Eurostar to run services to these locations.

When the Class 374 trains are used in the United Kingdom, they can only run on High Speed 1, which has been designed to accommodate larger trains from mainland Europe, having a larger loading gauge compared to the domestic British rail network.

The original order for ten sets was increased to seventeen sets in November 2014. As of June 2018, the Class 374 has replaced the majority of Class 373s, with most Class 373 trains having since been withdrawn and scrapped in the UK.

Development

Siemens Velaro high speed EMUs are derived from the ICE 3 first used by Deutsche Bahn (DB) in 2000. Variants include DB Class 407, intended for international services including through the Channel Tunnel.

In 2009, Eurostar announced a £700m project to update its fleet, with approximately £550m for new trains able to operate away from the core London-Paris/Brussels network. In October 2010, Eurostar announced that Siemens had been selected, with the Velaro platform to be used.

Alstom litigation
The nomination of Siemens saw it break into the French high-speed market, as all French and French subsidiary high-speed operators up to that point used TGV derivatives produced by Alstom. Alstom attempted legal action to prevent the contract, claiming that the Siemens sets would breach Channel Tunnel safety rules, but this was thrown out of court. Alstom said that it would "pursue alternative legal options to uphold its position", and on 4 November 2010 it lodged a complaint with the European Commission over the tendering process, which then asked the British government for "clarification". Alstom then announced it had started legal action against Eurostar in the High Court in London.
In July 2011, the High Court rejected Alstom's claim that the tender process was "ineffective", and in April 2012 Alstom said it would call off pending court actions against Eurostar.

Construction and delivery

The trains were constructed at the Siemens plant at Krefeld in Germany, with the first rolled out for testing at the Wildenrath test circuit in early 2013 as Class 374, with the first unit bearing this UIC identification mark. The intention was for the first unit to enter service in 2014, but the approval was delayed. As a consequence, Eurostar did receive its first unit in 2014 for presentation but operation could only start a year later.

At the presentation of the first train in London in November 2014, Eurostar announced that they had ordered 7 additional train sets, and that the first e320 service would be at the end of 2015. By November 2014 nine of the 10 trains had been built and all 10  were scheduled to be delivered by April 2016. The seven trains in the second order were all operational by March 2018.

Testing

By April 2013 testing had started at Siemens Mobility's Wegberg-Wildenrath Test and Validation Centre.

On 27 January 2014 set 4007+4008 was hauled across Belgium by B-Logistiks' TRAXX E 186 199, and on the night of 29/30 January 2014 was dragged by Eurotunnel Class 0001 rescue locomotives via the Channel Tunnel and High Speed 1 to Temple Mills Depot where it arrived at 01:41:30 on 30 January 2014.

As of July to August 2014, tests were carried out on the LGV Nord line near Lille. The end of 2014 saw testing of one set on the LGV Est due to its higher line speed of 320 km/h.

The French Railway Safety Board (EPSF) granted an authorisation to run the train in France on 16 October 2015; the approval for operating through the Channel Tunnel was granted on 19 November by the Intergovernmental Commission (IGC).  At the beginning of January 2016 the Belgian authority SSICF authorized the operation in its country.

Operations

Eurostar have used the trains to expand its core operation between London St Pancras International, Paris Gare du Nord and Brussels Midi/Zuid. To meet the prospect of increased competition through the Channel Tunnel (primarily from DB), it intends to use them to expand its network to Amsterdam, Frankfurt and Cologne, and more destinations in France. The first Class 374 set entered service in November 2015, ahead of the full launch of the new type; the receipt of the safety authorisation from the Intergovernmental Commission was received earlier than expected, allowing Eurostar to begin utilizing the type on a small number of services for in-service testing. In September 2013, Eurostar announced that its new service between London and Amsterdam, intended to begin operation in December 2016, would be operated by the trains. Since April 2018 the scheduled service to Amsterdam operates with two e320 trains per day.

In early 2018, the tracks and international platforms at Ashford International underwent a £10-million refurbishment to allow compatibility with Eurostar's e320 trains from 1 April 2018. On 3 April 2018, the Secretary of State for Transport Chris Grayling met the first e320 that called at the station after the works have been called "completed" by the local authority. Problems with "power spikes" which damaged equipment of the new trains, however, initially prevented Class 374 trains from calling at Ashford, with the problem resolved in December 2019.

Fleet details
The carriages are given a UIC identification marking in half-sets of eight-vehicles as 93 70 3740 NNN-X GB-EIL, where 93 denotes high-speed EMU, 70 denotes Great Britain, 374 is the class, 40NN (sharing the 4 from the class 374) is the unit number followed by a single digit for each carriage counting from the driving car towards the centre, a check digit (X), GB for Great Britain and EIL for Eurostar International Limited.

Each set is formed of 16 coaches:

See also
Siemens Velaro
British Rail Class 373
Eurostar
ICE 3

References

External links

Specification Sheet
Virtual visit of the Class 374 interior

High-speed trains of the United Kingdom
374
Eurostar
Passenger trains running at least at 300 km/h in commercial operations
Siemens Velaro
Siemens multiple units
Train-related introductions in 2015
15 kV AC multiple units
3000 V DC multiple units
25 kV AC multiple units
1500 V DC multiple units of France
1500 V DC multiple units of the Netherlands